BFI Flare: London LGBTIQ+ Film Festival, formerly known as the London Lesbian and Gay Film Festival (LLGFF), is the biggest LGBTIQ+ film festival in Europe. It takes place every spring in London, England. It began in 1986, as a season of gay and lesbian films at the National Film Theatre for two years, under the title "Gay's Own Pictures", curated by Peter Packer of the Tyneside Cinema. It was renamed the 'London Lesbian and Gay Film Festival' in 1988. Having been a two-week festival for many years, the festival was shortened to a week in 2011, then increased to 10 days in 2012. The events name change to BFI Flare occurred in 2014. On its 30th anniversary, screenings attendance at BFI Flare was up 9% and box-office results surpassed the previous, record-breaking year. Audiences at all events and screenings over the eleven-day festival totalled 25,623 in 2016. Additional programming under the BFI Flare tag is available at throughout the year.

Organised and run by the British Film Institute, all BFI Flare screenings take place in the BFI Southbank.

In 2014 the festival consisted of several sections or categories of films; hearts, bodies, minds. Subsequent years have included additional categories.

See also

List of LGBT events
List of LGBT film festivals
LGBT culture in London

References

External links
 Official website

Film festivals in London
LGBT events in England
LGBT film festivals
LGBT film festivals in the United Kingdom
LGBT culture in London
British Film Institute
Film festivals established in 1986
1986 establishments in England
Annual events in London